The White Horse is a public house on the south side of Castle Street, Hertford, England. 
The pub occupies numbers 31 and 33 Castle Street, two of a group of three grade II listed houses that also includes number 35. The timber-framed buildings date from the sixteenth and seventeenth centuries with later additions. 
The pub is under the management of Fullers Brewery.

References

External links

White Horse, UK Pub History and London.

Grade II listed pubs in Hertfordshire
Timber framed pubs in Hertfordshire
Buildings and structures in Hertford